Club Deportivo Badajoz "B" is a Spanish football team based in Badajoz, in the autonomous community of Extremadura. Refounded in 2013 as the reserve team of CD Badajoz, it currently plays in  – , and holds home games at Estadio Nuevo Vivero, with a 14,898-seat capacity.

History
Club Deportivo Careva was founded in 1965, and was renamed Club Deportivo Badajoz Promesas in 1977, but had no affiliation with CD Badajoz. Meanwhile, in the 1971–72 and 1974–75 seasons, and between 1979 and 1982, a club called Club Deportivo Badajoz B (this one being a reserve team of Badajoz) played in the regional leagues.

Badajoz Promesas achieved promotion to Tercera División in 1983, but suffered relegation to the Regional Preferente in 1985. In that year, after Badajoz was relegated to the fourth division, Antonio Guevara (at the time president of Badajoz Promesas) became president of Badajoz, and turned Badajoz Promesas into a reserve team.

In 1993, Badajoz Promesas was renamed into CD Badajoz B, being fully integrated into the Badajoz's structure, and playing in the fourth tier until 2005. In the following year, after the first team's relegation to the fourth division, the B-team ceased activities.

In 2013, Badajoz B returned to an active status, one year after the first team's refoundation. In 2021, the club achieved promotion to the Tercera División RFEF, the new fifth tier.

Season to season

Careva / Badajoz Promesas

8 seasons in Tercera División

Old Badajoz B

Badajoz B (1993–2006)

12 seasons in Tercera División

Team re-founded

1 season in Tercera División RFEF

References

External links
Official website 

B
Football clubs in Extremadura
Association football clubs established in 1965
Association football clubs disestablished in 2006
Association football clubs established in 2013
1965 establishments in Spain
2006 disestablishments in Spain
2013 establishments in Spain
Spanish reserve football teams